Carex hordeistichos, called barley sedge, is a species of flowering plant in the genus Carex, native to northwest Africa, southern, central and eastern Europe, and western Asia as far as Iran and Kazakhstan. Its chromosome number is 2n=58, with numerous variants reported.

References

hordeistichos
Plants described in 1779